Flim-flam may refer to:

 Confidence trick, a fraud scheme
 Flim-Flam (album), a 1991 album by saxophonists Steve Lacy and Steve Potts
 Flim-Flam!, a 1982 book by James Randi
 Flim Flam, a character from Scooby-Doo
 Flim Flam (horse), a Hanoverian gelding

See also
 Flim Flam Brothers, a pair of antagonists on My Little Pony: Friendship Is Magic
 The Flim-Flam Man, a 1967 film
 Flam (disambiguation)
 Flim (disambiguation)